Tridens flavus, the purpletop tridens, red top, or greasegrass, is a large, robust perennial bunchgrass native to eastern North America.

It widespread throughout its range and is most often found in man-made habitats, such as hay meadows and lawns.

The seeds are purple, giving the grass its common name. The seeds are also oily, leading to its other common name, "greasegrass". It reproduces by seed and tillers.

The grass is often confused with the similar looking Johnson grass (Sorghum halepense), although it is only distantly related. Tridens flavus is easily distinguished by its short, hairy ligule.

It is a larval host to the common wood nymph, crossline skipper, little glassywing, and the Zabulon skipper.

Gallery

References

External links
 Samuel Roberts Noble Foundation
 Illinois Wildflowers

Chloridoideae
Bunchgrasses of North America
Plants described in 1753
Taxa named by Carl Linnaeus